Vuk Kulenovic (21 July 1946 – 10 April 2017) was a Serbian contemporary composer and teacher based in Boston, Massachusetts. He taught counterpoint, orchestration and directed study at Berklee College of Music. He composed and had commissions from around the world. His influences were wide-ranging, including jazz, Indian ragas, Balkan folk music, rock and many other contemporary styles. He wrote over 100 works for symphony orchestra, solo instruments, chamber ensembles, choral and vocal pieces, ballet, and scores for film and stage music.

Life

Early Years
Vuk was born in Sarajevo, Bosnia and Herzegovina, Yugoslavia in 1946 as the son of Skender Kulenović. He studied piano and composition at Ljubljana Academy of Music with Alojz Srebotnjak in Slovenia and later at Belgrade University with Enriko Josif. Later he studied in Stuttgart, Germany under Milko Kelemen. During his studies, the popular approach to composition was in 12-tone technique brought to the world by Arnold Schoenberg. This had little influence on Kulenovic and he wrote in the minimalist style before it was given then name and popularized by composers such as Steve Reich and Philip Glass. He taught at Belgrade University 1979-1990 where he himself received his Masters of Music.

Coming to America
In June 1992, Kulenovic organized a protest against the policies of Serbian president Slobodan Milošević in Belgrade, composed of musicians and artists, the first of its kind. Consequently, his actions were noticed by the media and put him in an unfavorable position with the government he was protesting against. After experiencing destruction of his property and receiving a call for execution by an extremist newspaper he, his wife, and two sons fled the country to the United States with a Fulbright scholarship provided by the New England Conservatory in Boston. After lecturing at local colleges in Boston (as well as other schools) he made the decision to make his home in Boston and began teaching at Berklee College of Music in the autumn of 1996. He continued to teach at Berklee and remain an active composer until his death in April 2017.

Music
In Berklee Today of Spring 1997 Vuk is quotes as saying "my music was always closer to popular genres in a way. For instance, there are rock elements in my string orchestra piece Mechanical Orpheus and in Boogie, a piano concerto."

Thoughts on Electric Symphony

Works (Incomplete)

Pieces for Solo Instruments
 Boogie Piano Concerto
 Vanishing Landscapes Concerto for Guitar and Orchestra (1994)
 Concerto Grosso for Cello and String Orchestra (2001)
 Adoration of Moon for chamber orchestra and solo violin  (2005)

Film Scores
Here is a list of Films Vuk Kulenovic is given credit for from the Internet Movie Database. 
 Iskusavanje djavola (1989)
 In the Name of the People (1987)
 Kraljeva zavrsnica (1987)
 Davitelj protiv davitelja (1984)
 Dorotej (1981)
 Covjek, covjeku (1973)

Other Films
 South Africa: Beyond a Miracle (2001)
 Prelude to Kosovo: War and Peace in Bosnia and Croatia (1999) (Co-composed with Alexis Gavras & Vedran Smailovic)

Quotes
"Kulenovic is one of the most important and interesting composers working in the area -- or anywhere -- today." - Richard Dyer of the Boston Globe

Sources

External links
 "Electric Symphony" on www.cdbaby.com
 Official Myspace Page
 Unofficial Interview by Roberto Toscano
 Night Wanderings by Apostolos Paraskevas - Features Vuk's "Vanishing Landscapes

1946 births
2017 deaths
Musicians from Sarajevo
University of Belgrade alumni
University of Ljubljana alumni
21st-century classical composers
Bosnia and Herzegovina composers
Berklee College of Music faculty
Serbian emigrants to the United States
Male classical composers
21st-century male musicians